Prey is the eighth studio album by Swedish gothic metal band Tiamat. It was released on October 27, 2003 through Century Media Records.

The song "Cain" appeared in Troika Games' 2004 PC game Vampire: The Masquerade – Bloodlines.

Track listing

Personnel

Tiamat
 Johan Edlund – vocals, guitars, keyboards
 Thomas Petersson – guitars
 Anders Iwers – bass guitar
 Lars Sköld – drums

Additional personnel
 Johan Edlund – engineering, production, design, layout
 Sonja Brandt – additional vocals 
 Sam Carpenter – engineering
 T. T. Oksala – mixing
 Minerva Pappi – mastering
 Katja Kuhl – photography

References

Tiamat (band) albums
2003 albums
Gothic rock albums by Swedish artists